Victor Cha Mou Zing is a Hong Kong businessman and has extensive experience in property development and textile manufacturing. He is the Chairman of HKR International Limited.

Career 
Victor Cha was appointed executive director, managing director, deputy chairman and chairman in 1989, 2001, 2007 and 2020 respectively. He is a non-executive director of Mingly Corporation. He is also the chairman of both the Hong Kong Arts Festival and the Hong Kong Trade Development Council’s Hong Kong-Japan Business Co-operation Committee. He is a member of the board of trustees of The Better Hong Kong Foundation, a member of the Board of Trustee of the Cha Foundation, an Executive Committee Member of Qiu Shi Science and Technologies Foundation and a trustee of the Sang Ma Trust Fund.

References 

Year of birth missing (living people)
Living people
HKR International
Hong Kong businesspeople
Stanford University alumni